Brachyolus bagooides is a broad-nosed weevil that is endemic to New Zealand. This species can be found in private gardens in Dunedin and the Rock and Pillar Range of Otago.

References

Brachycerinae
Beetles described in 1886